Leif Sinding (19 November 1895 – 13 May 1985) was a Norwegian film director and journalist.

He worked for the newspapers Verdens Gang, Aftenposten, and Morgenbladet. Among his silent films are Himmeluret from 1925, based on Gabriel Scott's comedy, and Fjeldeventyret from 1926. He directed the film Bra mennesker (1937), based on a play by Oskar Braaten, and the films De vergeløse (1939) and Tante Pose (1940), both based on novels by Gabriel Scott. In 1941 he directed the comedy Kjærlighet og vennskap. During the German occupation of Norway Sinding collaborated with the Axis forces, was a member of Nasjonal Samling, and was sentenced to four years forced labour after the war.

Filmography
 Himmeluret (1925)
 Simen Mustrøens besynderlige opplevelser (1926)
 Den nye lensmannen (1926)
 Syv dage for Elisabeth (1927)
 Fjeldeventyret (1927)
 Fantegutten (1932)
 Jeppe på bjerget (1933)
 Morderen uten ansikt (1936) 
 Bra mennesker (1937)
 Eli Sjursdotter (1938) 
 De vergeløse (1939) 
 Tante Pose (1940) 
 Kjærlighet og vennskap (1941)
 Sangen til livet (1943) 
 Selkvinnen (1953)
 Heksenetter (1954)
 Gylne ungdom (1956)

References

External links

1895 births
1985 deaths
Norwegian film directors
Members of Nasjonal Samling
People convicted of treason for Nazi Germany against Norway
Norwegian prisoners and detainees
20th-century Norwegian journalists